The Generation '45 was a group of writers, mainly from Uruguay, who had a notable influence in the literary and cultural life of their country and region. Their name derives from the fact that their careers started out mainly between 1945 and 1950.

Writers
Some of the writers who belonged to this group were Juan Carlos Onetti, Manuel Flores Mora, Mario Benedetti, Sarandy Cabrera, Carlos Martínez Moreno, Ángel Rama, Carlos Real de Azúa, Carlos Maggi, Alfredo Gravina, Mario Arregui, Amanda Berenguer, Humberto Megget, María Inés Silva Vila, Tola Invernizzi, Emir Rodríguez Monegal, Mauricio Muller, Ida Vitale, Idea Vilariño, Gladys Castelvecchi, José Pedro Díaz, Líber Falco, Carlos Brandy, María de Montserrat, Giselda Zani, Armonía Somers, Juan Cunha.

See also 

 Generation of '27

References

Uruguayan writers
Uruguayan literature
Literary movements
20th-century literature